The 2001 Men's World Water Polo Championship was the ninth edition of the men's water polo tournament at the World Aquatics Championships, organised by the world governing body in aquatics, the FINA. The tournament was held from 19 to 29 July 2001, and was incorporated into the 2001 World Aquatics Championships in Fukuoka, Japan.

Participating teams

Groups formed

Group A
 
 
 
 

Group B
 
 
 
 

Group C
 
 
 
 

Group D

Squads

Preliminary round

Group A

 July 19, 2001

 July 21, 2001

 July 22, 2001

Group B

 July 19, 2001

 July 21, 2001

 July 22, 2001

Group C

 July 19, 2001

 July 21, 2001

 July 22, 2001

Group D

 July 19, 2001

 July 21, 2001

 July 22, 2001

Second round

Group E

Preliminary round results apply.

 July 24, 2001

 July 25, 2001

 July 26, 2001

Group F

Preliminary round results apply.

 July 24, 2001

 July 25, 2001

 July 26, 2001

Group G

 July 24, 2001

 July 25, 2001

 July 26, 2001

Final round

9th-12th place

 July 28, 2001

 July 29, 2001 — 9th place

 July 29, 2001 — 11th place

5th-8th place

 July 28, 2001

 July 29, 2001 — 5th place

 July 29, 2001 — 7th place

1st-4th place

Semi finals
 July 28, 2001

Finals
 July 29, 2001 —  Bronze Medal Match

 July 29, 2001 —  Gold Medal Match

Final ranking

Medalists

Individual awards
 Best Goalkeeper
 

 Topscorer
  — 18 goals

References

External links
 9th FINA World Championships 2001 FINA Water Polo website
 Men Water Polo World Championship 2001 Fukuoka www.todor66.com

2001
Men